Konstantin Viktorovich Altunin (born December 21, 1967) is a Russian painter from Arkhangelsk, Russia. He left Russia following a controversy after a painting of Vladimir Putin and Dmitry Medvedev in women's underwear had been seized by St. Petersburg authorities. He has been exhibiting paintings since 2000.

Other controversial paintings by Altunin
On another painting Altunin depicted the politician Vitaly Milonov against a rainbow background. The rainbow is the symbol of the LGBT community. He also produced a painting with Putin wearing women's underwear and painted a sculpted head of Lenin with dripping rainbow colors.

References

External links

Website  
"Poutine en sous-vêtements féminins: le peintre quitte la Russie." Libération. 28 August 2013.

1967 births
20th-century Russian painters
Russian male painters
21st-century Russian painters
Living people
Political controversies in Russia
20th-century Russian male artists
21st-century Russian male artists